Harrington Park is a borough in Bergen County, in the U.S. state of New Jersey. As of the 2020 United States census, the borough's population was 4,741, an increase of 77 (+1.7%) from the 2010 census count of 4,664, which in turn reflected a decrease of 76 (−1.6%) from the 4,740 counted in the 2000 census.

Harrington Park was formed on March 29, 1904, from portions of Harrington Township and Washington Township, and parts of the borough of Closter.

The name Harrington Park was based on the larger Harrington Township from which it was in part derived, which in turn was based on the family name Haring, who were early settlers of the region.

Geography
According to the United States Census Bureau, the borough had a total area of 2.06 square miles (5.34 km2), including 1.85 square miles (4.78 km2) of land and 0.22 square miles (0.56 km2) of water (10.53%).

The borough borders Closter, Emerson, Norwood, Old Tappan and River Vale.

Demographics

2010 census

The Census Bureau's 2006–2010 American Community Survey showed that (in 2010 inflation-adjusted dollars) median household income was $115,875 (with a margin of error of +/− $28,119) and the median family income was $132,108 (+/− $18,521). Males had a median income of $95,119 (+/− $12,806) versus $49,656 (+/− $16,730) for females. The per capita income for the borough was $49,159 (+/− $5,612). About none of families and 1.0% of the population were below the poverty line, including none of those under age 18 and 1.2% of those age 65 or over.

2000 census
As of the 2000 United States census, there were 4,740 people, 1,563 households, and 1,344 families residing in the borough. The population density was 2,555.0 people per square mile (983.9/km2). There were 1,583 housing units at an average density of 853.3 per square mile (328.6/km2). The racial makeup of the borough was 83.52% White, 0.68% African American, 0.04% Native American, 14.66% Asian, 0.63% from other races, and 0.46% from two or more races. Hispanic or Latino of any race were 2.57% of the population.

There were 1,563 households, out of which 44.4% had children under the age of 18 living with them, 78.4% were married couples living together, 6.1% had a female householder with no husband present, and 14.0% were non-families. 12.2% of all households were made up of individuals, and 7.4% had someone living alone who was 65 years of age or older. The average household size was 3.03 and the average family size was 3.31.

In the borough the population was spread out, with 28.6% under the age of 18, 5.0% from 18 to 24, 25.3% from 25 to 44, 28.3% from 45 to 64, and 12.8% who were 65 years of age or older. The median age was 40 years. For every 100 females, there were 94.7 males. For every 100 females age 18 and over, there were 91.0 males.

The median income for a household in the borough was $100,302, and the median income for a family was $124,376. Males had a median income of $71,776 versus $42,833 for females. The per capita income for the borough was $39,017. About 1.8% of families and 2.9% of the population were below the poverty line, including 4.6% of those under age 18 and 1.2% of those age 65 or over.

Government

Local government

Harrington Park is governed under the Borough form of New Jersey municipal government, which is used in 218 municipalities (of the 564) statewide, making it the most common form of government in New Jersey. The governing body is comprised of a Mayor and a Borough Council, with all positions elected at-large on a partisan basis as part of the November general election. A Mayor is elected directly by the voters to a four-year term of office. The Borough Council is comprised of six members elected to serve three-year terms on a staggered basis, with two seats coming up for election each year in a three-year cycle. The Borough form of government used by Harrington Park is a "weak mayor / strong council" government in which council members act as the legislative body with the mayor presiding at meetings and voting only in the event of a tie. The mayor can veto ordinances subject to an override by a two-thirds majority vote of the council. The mayor makes committee and liaison assignments for council members, and most appointments are made by the mayor with the advice and consent of the council.

, the Mayor of Harrington Park is Independent Paul A. Hoelscher, whose term of office expires December 31, 2023. Members of the Harrington Park Borough Council are Council President Diane G. Walker (I, 2025), William Blackinton (I, 2024), Joon L. Chung (I, 2023), Gregory J. Evanella (I, 2025), Allan S. Napolitano (I, 2023) and Jorden "Nick" Pedersen (I, 2024).

In March 2016, Diane Walker was selected to fill the vacant seat (expiring in December 2016) of Michael Rutigliano, who cited personal reasons for his resignation from office the previous month.

Federal, state and county representation
Harrington Park is located in the 5th Congressional District and is part of New Jersey's 39th state legislative district.

Politics
As of March 2011, there were a total of 3,243 registered voters in Harrington Park, of which 813 (25.1% vs. 31.7% countywide) were registered as Democrats, 813 (25.1% vs. 21.1%) were registered as Republicans and 1,615 (49.8% vs. 47.1%) were registered as Unaffiliated. There was one voter registered to another party. Among the borough's 2010 Census population, 69.5% (vs. 57.1% in Bergen County) were registered to vote, including 96.5% of those ages 18 and over (vs. 73.7% countywide).

In the 2016 presidential election, Democrat Hillary Clinton received 1,382 votes (51.7% vs. 54.8% countywide), ahead of Republican Donald Trump with 1,147 votes (42.9% vs. 41.6%) and other candidates with 76 votes (2.8% vs. 3.0%), among the 2,673 ballots cast by the borough's 3,510 registered voters, for a turnout of 76.2% (vs. 72.5% in Bergen County). In the 2012 presidential election, Republican Mitt Romney received 1,340 votes (51.2% vs. 43.5% countywide), ahead of Democrat Barack Obama with 1,218 votes (46.5% vs. 54.8%) and other candidates with 32 votes (1.2% vs. 0.9%), among the 2,618 ballots cast by the borough's 3,447 registered voters, for a turnout of 76.0% (vs. 70.4% in Bergen County). In the 2008 presidential election, Republican John McCain received 1,371 votes (49.7% vs. 44.5% countywide), ahead of Democrat Barack Obama with 1,355 votes (49.1% vs. 53.9%) and other candidates with 14 votes (0.5% vs. 0.8%), among the 2,761 ballots cast by the borough's 3,413 registered voters, for a turnout of 80.9% (vs. 76.8% in Bergen County). In the 2004 presidential election, Republican George W. Bush received 1,445 votes (52.8% vs. 47.2% countywide), ahead of Democrat John Kerry with 1,263 votes (46.2% vs. 51.7%) and other candidates with 22 votes (0.8% vs. 0.7%), among the 2,735 ballots cast by the borough's 3,324 registered voters, for a turnout of 82.3% (vs. 76.9% in the whole county).

In the 2013 gubernatorial election, Republican Chris Christie received 63.6% of the vote (1,019 cast), ahead of Democrat Barbara Buono with 34.9% (559 votes), and other candidates with 1.4% (23 votes), among the 1,655 ballots cast by the borough's 3,307 registered voters (54 ballots were spoiled), for a turnout of 50.0%. In the 2009 gubernatorial election, Republican Chris Christie received 994 votes (51.2% vs. 45.8% countywide), ahead of Democrat Jon Corzine with 815 votes (42.0% vs. 48.0%), Independent Chris Daggett with 90 votes (4.6% vs. 4.7%) and other candidates with 13 votes (0.7% vs. 0.5%), among the 1,941 ballots cast by the borough's 3,338 registered voters, yielding a 58.1% turnout (vs. 50.0% in the county).

Education
The Harrington Park School District serves public school students in pre-kindergarten through eighth grade at Harrington Park School. As of the 2021–22 school year, the district, comprised of one school, had an enrollment of 644 students and 56.9 classroom teachers (on an FTE basis), for a student–teacher ratio of 11.3:1.

Students in public school for ninth through twelfth grades attend Northern Valley Regional High School at Old Tappan, together with students from Northvale, Norwood and Old Tappan, along with students from Rockleigh who attend the high school as part of a sending/receiving relationship. The school is one of the two schools of the Northern Valley Regional High School District, which also serves students from the neighboring communities of Closter, Demarest, Haworth at the Northern Valley Regional High School at Demarest. During the 1994–1996 school years, Northern Valley Regional High School at Old Tappan was awarded the Blue Ribbon School Award of Excellence by the United States Department of Education. As of the 2021–22 school year, the high school had an enrollment of 1,044 students and 104.0 classroom teachers (on an FTE basis), for a student–teacher ratio of 10.0:1.
Public school students from the borough, and all of Bergen County, are eligible to attend the secondary education programs offered by the Bergen County Technical Schools, which include the Bergen County Academies in Hackensack, and the Bergen Tech campus in Teterboro or Paramus. The district offers programs on a shared-time or full-time basis, with admission based on a selective application process and tuition covered by the student's home school district.

Transportation

Roads and highways

The most significant roads serving Harrington Park are County Route 502 and County Route 505.

Public transportation
NJ Transit bus route 167 serves Harrington Park, providing service to and from the Port Authority Bus Terminal in Midtown Manhattan.

Rockland Coaches 14ET and 20/20T routes provide service to the Port Authority Bus Terminal.

Saddle River Tours / Ameribus offers service on the 20 / 84 route to the George Washington Bridge Bus Station.

Notable people

People who were born in, residents of, or otherwise closely associated with Harrington Park include:

 Craig Beardsley (born 1961), record-setting swimmer
 Cory Booker (born 1969), former Mayor of Newark, New Jersey, and now junior senator representing New Jersey in the United States Senate after his election victory in October 2013
 Gregory Jacobs (born 1968), film director, producer and screenwriter, who has frequently collaborated with several film directors, most notably Steven Soderbergh
 Greta Kiernan (born 1933), politician who served in the New Jersey General Assembly from the 39th Legislative District from 1978 to 1980
 Beth Leavel (born 1955), Tony Award-winning Broadway actress
 Jimmy Lydon (1923–2022), movie and television actor
 Omar Minaya (born 1958), former General Manager for the New York Mets
 Jennifer Moore (1988–2006), high school student murdered in July 2006 after a night of clubbing in New York City
 Esmeralda Negron (born 1983), professional soccer player who played for the New Jersey Wildcats
 Karl Nessler (1872–1951), inventor of the permanent wave
 James O'Brien  (born 1969) author, screenwriter and film director
 Dan Pasqua (born 1961), baseball player for the New York Yankees
 Jon Rudnitsky (born 1989), comedian and cast member on Saturday Night Live
 Angela Santomero (born 1968), Nickelodeon executive and co-creator of Blue's Clues
 Jackie Simes (born 1942), track cyclist who competed at the 1960, 1964 and 1968 Summer Olympics and was the 1964 U.S. National Champion
 Jean-Claude Suares (1942–2013), illustrator who was the first Op-ed page art director at The New York Times
 A. W. Tillinghast (1874–1942), golf course architect of Ridgewood Country Club, Baltusrol Golf Club, Aronimink Golf Club, Winged Foot Golf Club and many other notable courses

References

Sources

 Municipal Incorporations of the State of New Jersey (according to Counties) prepared by the Division of Local Government, Department of the Treasury (New Jersey); December 1, 1958.
 Clayton, W. Woodford; and Nelson, Nelson. History of Bergen and Passaic Counties, New Jersey, with Biographical Sketches of Many of its Pioneers and Prominent Men. Philadelphia: Everts and Peck, 1882.
 Harvey, Cornelius Burnham (ed.), Genealogical History of Hudson and Bergen Counties, New Jersey. New York: New Jersey Genealogical Publishing Co., 1900.
 Van Valen, James M. History of Bergen County, New Jersey. New York: New Jersey Publishing and Engraving Co., 1900.
 Westervelt, Frances A. (Frances Augusta), 1858–1942, History of Bergen County, New Jersey, 1630–1923, Lewis Historical Publishing Company, 1923.

External links

 Harrington Park Borough website
 Harrington Park School District
 
 Data for Harrington Park School District, National Center for Education Statistics
 Northern Valley Regional High School District

 
1904 establishments in New Jersey
Borough form of New Jersey government
Boroughs in Bergen County, New Jersey
Populated places established in 1904